Cherrybelle, later known as Chibi Chibi, is an Indonesian girl group formed in 2011 under CBM Entertainment. The group debuted in 2011 with nine members consisting of Angel, Anisa, Cherly, Christy, Devi, Felly, Gigi, Ryn, and Wenda. In the following years after their debut, the group went through major member changes. In 2012, Devi and Wenda's contracts were terminated while Annisa departed the group in 2013; they were replaced by Kezia, Steffy, and Novi. In 2015, group-leader Cherly along with Felly, Gigi, Kezia, Ryn, and Steffy left the group citing differences with their label, leaving only Angel, Christy, and Novi. Despite continuing to introduce new members, the group keep losing its members until their indefinite hiatus in mid 2018.

History

2011 - 2015: Early career and member changes
Cherrybelle was formed on 27 February 2011. Beginning as a meeting of 2 old friends, Teguh Sanjaya & Dino Raturandang lightly discussed their desire to form a group consisting of teenage girls, although they could not imagine how many members it would later contain.
An announcement was sent through broadcast medium BlackBerry Messenger, detailing an audition for the formation of a new girl group. Dino held open auditions in Jakarta, in which 400 girls attended. After several auditions, nine girls were selected to be in the initial formation, thus conceiving a girl band that would later be named Cherrybelle. At the beginning of its formation, Chibi consisted of Angel, Anisa, Cherly, Christy, Devi, Felly, Gigi, Ryn, and Wenda. Cherrybelle is taken from two words borrowed from foreign languages, "cherry" & "belle" (beautiful in French). The philosophy behind this name was that the personnel of Cherrybelle were teenage girls who were "sweet", "adorable", "hot", & "beautiful".

After several months of training, including occasional rigorous practices lasting until 3 a.m., along with living together for a month to improve interpersonal relationships, in August 2011 Cherry Belle released Love is You, an EP with five tracks. The album was released as both a standard & deluxe edition. The band's 1st single, "Dilema" ("Dilemma") was released soon after and received significant airplay. Cherrybelle also performed regularly, both on television and in concert. They have also amassed numerous fans, who go by the nickname Twibies. On April 8 2012,the group launched Love is You, a film directed by Hanny Saputra, which detailed their rise to stardom. The members portrayed a fictionalized version of themselves. The film has the same title as their 2nd single.

On April 2012, the management announced the departure of Devi and Wenda who are considered "unfitting" for the group's image due to their age. Through the audition event Cherrybelle Cari Chibi, on 8 June 2012, the management officially announced that Kezia and Steffy are the 10th and 11th members of Chibi.

Cherrybelle managed to make history as the only girl group to hold concerts in 33 Provinces within 31 days, which was held on April 30-May 31, 2013. The concert entitled "Cherrybelle Beat Indonesia" was sponsored by PT Astra Honda Motor and Honda Beat, in order to promote the album Diam Diam Suka, and won the Record award MURI. On October 18, 2013, Anisa resigned to continue her studies which she put on hold for 2 years, after her absence from the group since September 2013. In the 3rd Anniversary Concert event (March 16, 2014), the management officially announced the 12th member of Chibi, Novi.

Under the agency Catz Records, Cherrybelle has released 3 albums, including Love is You (2011), Diam Diam Suka (2013), and Reborn (2015). In July 2015, 6 Cherrybelle members chose not to renew their contract with Catz Records and chose solo careers namely Cherly, Felly, Gigi, Kezia, Ryn, and Steffy. Through Cherrybelle's official Twitter account, the management officially announced that the remaining members, namely Christy, Angel, and Novi, will continue their careers in the group under a new agency, CBM Entertainment. On September 1, 2015, there will be a Cherrybelle new member search audition.

2015 - 2018: New Formation and Hiatus 
As of November 22, 2015, Cherrybelle has recruited 7 new members to fill Cherrybelle's vacancy for the past 3 months, with the new lineup being Christy, Novi, Laela, Onad, Yoeriche, Miftah, Ellen, Muti, and System. Angel had to give up his position in Cherrybelle to be replaced by a new member due to his focus on taking care of the household, but Angel is still active in Cherrybelle as a senior member.

In July 2016, two members of Cherrybelle formation 2015, namely Miftah and Ellen, chose to leave Cherrybelle because they wanted to wear the hijab, and in August 2016, Cherrybelle officially announced that the new members to replace Miftah and Ellen were Agatha and Fisca.

However, in September 2016, Christy officially announced that she was getting married, and would be a senior member of Cherrybelle, just like Angel. And finally, Cherrybelle again held auditions for Christy's successor.
For the period 2016-2017, the Cherrybelle formation is Novi, Yoeriche, Onad, Tata, Muti, Laela, Atha, and Fisca.

The year 2017 was also Cherrybelle's year of indefinite hiatus. In March 2017, Yoeriche, April 2017 Laela, and September 2017, Novi resigned from Cherrybelle.
So that Cherrybelle in 2018 only consisted of 5 people, namely Muti Chibi, Onad Chibi, Tata Chibi, Fisca Chibi, and Atha Chibi, as well as 2 senior personnel, namely Angel Chibi and Christy Chibi.

2021: Cherrybelle 2.0 and come back 
On August 17, 2021 in the Instagram account post, Cherrybelle will hold an audition titled "Cherrybelle 2.0". The audition was conducted online due to the COVID-19 pandemic.

During the 11th anniversary of the group, former pioneer members reunited as "Chibi Chibi" and begin appearing in numerous events.

Etymology 
Cherrybelle is taken from 2 foreign language words, namely Cherry (cherries) and Belle (beautiful - French). With the philosophy that Cherrybelle personnel are "Sweet" and "Beautiful" teenage girls.

Key Peoples

Former Members 

 * Angel announced her resignation during the announcement of new personnel Cherrybelle which resulted in the election of 7 new personnel from the previous plan of 6 people. However, Angel (sometimes) performed with nine members, so Cherrybelle often performed with 10 personnel and fans still consider Angel remains part of Cherrybelle.

 ** Cherly, Ryn, Gigi, Felly, Kezia and Steffy have formed a new idol group, called Mabelle on 11 November 2015, and debuted on Dahsyat television music show on RCTI on 2 April 2016. The group later reduced its members to only Felly, Ryn, and Steffy.

Discography

Filmography 
 Love is U (2012)
 Crush (2014)

References 
Footnotes

News sources

External links 
 
 
 
 

2011 establishments in Indonesia
Musical groups established in 2011
Indonesian girl groups
Indonesian-language singers
English-language singers from Indonesia
Musical groups from Jakarta
Anugerah Musik Indonesia winners